Edda Bresciani (23 September 1930 – 29 November 2020) was an Italian Egyptologist.

Life
Bresciani was born in Lucca, and graduated in 1955 from the University of Pisa. She excavated at several places in Egypt and is mainly known for her work at several sites in the Faiyum, most notably the temple of Medinet Maadi. She also found and excavated a Middle Kingdom cemetery at Khelua.

In 1974 the University of Pisa appointed Bresciani at the lead of an excavation campaign at Saqqara; here she studied the 26th Dynasty tomb of the vizier Bakenrenef. In 1978 she founded the still–running Egitto e Vicino Oriente, the Egyptological journal of the University. She also performed excavations at the "Temple of Million Years" of Thutmose IV at Thebes.

A proficient demotist, Bresciani published many books on her work. She earned a medal for meritorious science and culture in May 1996, and was a fellow of the Accademia dei Lincei. After her retirement, Bresciani became professor emerita at the University of Pisa.

Publications  

 Edda Bresciani, Sergio Pernigotti, ASSUAN. Il tempio Tolemaico di Isi. I blocchi decorati e iscritti, Pisa: Giardini, 1978
 L'Antico Egitto di Ippolito Rosellini nelle tavole dai monumenti dell'Egitto e della Nubia, Ed. Istituto geografico de Agostini, 
 Grande Enciclopedia illustrata dell'Antico Egitto (ed. E. Bresciani), Ed. De Agostini 1998, 2005, 
 Il Volto Di Osiri: Tele Funerarie Dipinte nell'Egitto Romano, Ed. Maria Pacini Fazzi, 
 Khelua: Una Necropoli Del Medio Regno Nel Fayum, ETS, 
 Nozioni elementari di grammatica demotica, Ed. Cisalpino-Goliardica, 
 Sulle Rive Del Nilo: L'Egitto Al Tempo Dei Faraoni, GLF editori Laterza, 
 Food and drink. Life resources in ancient Egypt, Pacini: Fazzi, 1997
 Letteratura e poesia dell'antico Egitto. Cultura e società attraverso i testi, Einaudi Tascabili, 2007, 
 I testi religiosi dell'antico Egitto, Mondadori, collana I Meridiani, 2001
 La piramide e la Torre. Duecento anni di archeologia egiziana (ed. E. Bresciani), Pisa, 2000
 Nine Pharaohs, Plus Pisa 2002 (Nove Faraoni, Plus: Pisa, 2001)
 Kom Madi 1977 e 1978. Le pitture murali del cenotafio di Alessandro Magno, Prima ristampa con aggiornamenti. With English text, Pisa, 2003
 Egypt in India. Egyptian Collection in Indian Museums (eds. E. Bresciani, M. Betrò), Pisa: Plus, 2004, 
 Edda Bresciani, Mario Del Tacca, Arte medica e cosmetica alla corte dei Faraoni/Medicine and cosmetics at Pharaohs' court, Pisa, 2005, Pacini, 
 La porta dei sogni. Interpreti e sognatori nell'Egitto antico, Einaudi Saggi, 2005, 
 Medinet Madi. Venti anni di esplorazione archeologica (1984-2005) (eds. Edda Bresciani, Antonio Giammarusti, Rosario Pintaudi, Flora Silvano) Pisa, 2006
 Ramesse II, Firenze: Giunti Editore, 2012,

References 

Italian Egyptologists
Italian women archaeologists
1930 births
2020 deaths
Writers from Lucca
Academic staff of the University of Pisa
University of Pisa alumni
20th-century Italian non-fiction writers
20th-century Italian women writers
20th-century archaeologists
21st-century Italian non-fiction writers
21st-century Italian women writers
21st-century archaeologists
Italian women non-fiction writers
Members of the Lincean Academy